Mahbubur Rahman is a retired lieutenant general of the Bangladesh Army who served as the Chief of Army Staff of the Bangladesh Army from May 1996 to December 1997. He was commissioned in the Pakistan Army Corps of Engineers from 17 special course on 2 March 1964. He is a member of Bangladesh Nationalist Party.

References 

Living people
Chiefs of Army Staff, Bangladesh
Bangladesh Nationalist Party politicians
Bangladesh Army generals
8th Jatiya Sangsad members
Year of birth missing (living people)